Tiantongyuannan Subdistrict is a subdistrict on the southern side of Changping District, Beijing, China. It borders Tiantongyuanbei Subdistrict in the north and east, Laiguangying Township and Aoyuncun Subdistrict in the south, Dongsheng and Dongxiaokou Towns in the west. Its population was 116,529 as of 2020.

The subdistrict was created in 2012. It took its name from Tiantongyuan, the community that it makes up the southern part of.

Administrative divisions 

As of 2021, Tiantongyuannan Subdistrict was composed of 16 subdivisions, of which 15 were communities, and 1 was a village:

Gallery

See also 

 List of township-level divisions of Beijing

References 

Changping District
Subdistricts of Beijing